Aloisia Bauer (born 11 June 1951) is a German former swimmer. She competed in two events at the 1968 Summer Olympics.

References

External links
 

1951 births
Living people
German female swimmers
Olympic swimmers of West Germany
Swimmers at the 1968 Summer Olympics
Sportspeople from Regensburg